Pique Newsmagazine is the only newspaper serving the resort community of Whistler, British Columbia. It was founded in 1994 and operated as an independent, locally owned weekly newspaper until July 2013, when it was purchased by Glacier Media. Today, Glacier Media continues to own and operate the paper with locally produced content and editorial staff.  

About 15,000 copies of the newsmagazine are distributed free each Thursday at over 200 distribution points from Vancouver to Mount Currie, including 130 distribution points in Whistler. It was started by Kathy Barnett, Bob Barnett, Kevin Damaskie and David Rigler.

Pique Newsmagazine also publishes the winter and summer FAQ - The Insiders Guide to Whistler, the winter and summer Whistler Magazine, Annual Crankd Bike Magazine and other publications.

See also
 Squamish Chief
 Similkameen News Leader 
 Canmore Leader
 Banff Crag & Canyon

References

External links
 Pique Magazine
 Squamish Chief

Weekly newspapers published in British Columbia
Whistler, British Columbia
Publications established in 1994
1994 establishments in British Columbia